Isaac Holmes (1758–1812) was an early American politician from South Carolina, serving as the 14th Lieutenant Governor of that State after the Revolution under Governor Charles Pinckney, as well as serving in both the South Carolina House and Senate. During the War, he had served in the Third Provincial Assembly, was a prisoner of war at both St. Augustine and Philadelphia, and had been an officer in the Militia prior to the fall of Charleston. Holmes was appointed by George Washington as Collector of Customs at the port of Charleston in 1791 but resigned the position in 1797, on account of his inability to adequately collect delinquent debts. Isaac Holmes held numerous other offices, memberships, and positions, including member of both the St. Andrews and South Carolina Societies, as well as the Charleston Library Society.

The U.S. Congressman, Isaac E. Holmes (1796–1897) is a nephew of this Isaac Holmes. Genealogical data is easily verifiable through primary source documents, including the Holmes Chart drafted by James Gadsden Holmes, filed in the Library of Congress, and available at the SC Historical Society.

References

1758 births
1812 deaths
Lieutenant Governors of South Carolina
American militia officers